Nikos Kaklamanos (born July 12, 1981 in Greece) is a Greek professional basketball player. He is 1.89 m (6 ft 2  in) in height. He can play at both the point guard and shooting guard positions.

Professional career
In his pro career, Kaklamanos has played with clubs such as: Olympia Larissa, Trikala 2000, Pagrati, Panelefsiniakos, Trikala Aries, Koroivos, Aiolos Astakou, Kastorias, and Karditsas. He was named the Greek 2nd Division Player of the Year, by the website Eurobasket.com, in 2008.

External links 
RealGM.com Profile
ProBallers.com Profile
Eurobasket.com Profile
Draftexpress.com Profile

Living people
1981 births
Aiolos Astakou B.C. players
Aries Trikala B.C. players
ASK Karditsas B.C. players
Greek men's basketball players
Kastorias B.C. players
Koroivos B.C. players
Olympia Larissa B.C. players
Pagrati B.C. players
Panelefsiniakos B.C. players
Point guards
Shooting guards
Trikala B.C. players
Basketball players from Athens